Zyryab is a 1990 album by flamenco guitarist Paco de Lucía and his sextet. It features jazz pianist Chick Corea and guitarist Manolo Sanlúcar. The album is named after Ziryab, a 9th-century Persian artist who is credited with introducing the Arabic oud to Spain, an instrument that would later become the Spanish guitar.

Content
Zyryab follows de Lucía's exploration of the new flamenco, especially through the presence of jazz pianist Chick Corea. The taranta "Tío Sabas" is dedicated to the flamenco composer Sabicas.

Track listing
All pieces written by Paco de Lucía, except where noted.

"Soniquete (Bulerías)" – 7:35
"Tío Sabas (Tarantas)" – 5:04
"Chick" – 3:46
"Compadres (Bulerías)" (Paco de Lucía & Manolo Sanlúcar) – 5:15
"Zyryab" (Paco de Lucía & Joan Albert Amargós)  – 6:15
"Canción de Amor" – 4:20
"Playa del Carmen (Rumba)" – 4:28
"Almonte (Fandangos de Huelva)" (Paco de Lucía & Chick Corea) – 5:32

Musicians

Paco de Lucía - flamenco guitar
Chick Corea - piano
Potito - vocals
Manolo Sanlucar - flamenco guitar
Rubem Dantas - percussion, cajón
Carles Benavent - mandola, bass
Jorge Pardo - flute
Joan Albert Amargós - arranger

References

 Gamboa, Manuel José and Nuñez, Faustino. (2003). Paco de Lucía. Madrid:Universal Music Spain.

1990 albums
Paco de Lucía albums
PolyGram albums